Gary Lee Aspden (born 27 September 1969) is an English brand consultant and designer notable for his association with adidas.

A native of Darwen, Lancashire, Aspden began collaborating with adidas in the 1990s, and gained prominence through successful outreach with celebrities while working for the entertainment marketing team. After nine years with adidas UK, he started his own consulting agency, Darwen Design, but is the chief curator of adidas' Spezial line, which he created in 2013.

In 2019, he held an exhibit of more than 1,000 trainers in Blackburn, where he was educated at Queen Elizabeth's Grammar School.

References

External links 
 

1969 births
People from Darwen
Living people
English fashion designers
English marketing people
Adidas people
People educated at Queen Elizabeth's Grammar School, Blackburn